Yamaha Portasound electronic musical keyboards were produced by the Yamaha Corporation during the 1980s and 1990s. The name suggests the instruments' portability, with battery operation being a consistent feature across the line. Many of these keyboards were designed for children with small keys and simple preset functions suitable for educational use. In 1982 the line introduced a card reader system which allowed players to learn and play along with sequenced songs. The PSS line features mini keys and the PSR line features full size keys. Some of the higher-end keyboards have advanced features like programmable synthesizer controls, midi capability, and sampler functions.

Contemporary use 
Electronic musicians and sound engineers have used these instruments to achieve an authentic lo-fi sound and some modify them with circuit bending to extend their sound palettes. As of 2015, musician Dan Friel continues to use a Portasound that he received as a gift in 1984. Circa 2017, Italian artist Modula released an EP called 780's Chronicles, recorded primarily using a Yamaha PSS780. Cyril Hahn uses a Yamaha PSS380 in his original compositions, and notes its noise profile as an endearing characteristic.

Unofficial software and VST plug-ins 
In the 21st century, several independent software developers have produced additional tools to modify and store patches for midi-capable PSS keyboards, such as PSS Edit, PSS Wave Editor and CTRLR. VST plug-in soft-synth versions of some of these keyboards have also been released by various developers, including the Yamaha PSS-170 and PSS-480 by Audio Animals, GSS-370 (based on the PSS370 keyboard) and PortaFM.

References 

Electronic musical instruments
Yamaha synthesizers